Seongnam FC is a South Korean professional football club based in Seongnam, South Korea, who currently play in the K-League. Seongnam FC participated under the name of Ilhwa chunma from 1993–94 Asian Club Championship and won the title in their second season in the Asia. Their first Asian game was against Kedah FA of Malaysia.

Since Asian Club Championship renamed as AFC Champions League, Seongnam Ilhwa Chunma was close to win the title again in 2004 AFC Champions League, but massive 0–5 loss to Ittihad FC in 2nd leg of the final costs them the title and made the legendary coach, Cha Kyung-bok to resign.

After the shocking defeat in 2004, Seongnam Ilhwa Chunma moved their home games to Tancheon Stadium and has been built a strong home record. By the end of their latest participation in the 2015 AFC Champions League, they recorded 14 wins, 4 draws and 1 loss out of 19 games.

Honours
 AFC Champions League
 Winners (2): 1995, 2010
 Runners-up (2): 1996–97, 2004
 Asian Super Cup
 Winners (1): 1996
 A3 Champions Cup
 Winners (1): 2004
 FIFA Club World Cup
 Fourth place (1): 2010 as the Asian representatives
 Afro-Asian Club Championship
 Winners (1): 1996 as the Asian representatives

Matches

Record

By season

By Competition

By Country

References

Seongnam FC
South Korean football clubs in international competitions